African mahogany is a marketing name for several African trees whose wood has properties similar to New World mahogany species.

 genus Entandrophragma of the family Meliaceae
 genus Khaya of the family Meliaceae
 genus Afzelia of the family Fabaceae (legumes)